Blanck Mass is a British electronic solo project by Ivor Novello Award-winning composer Benjamin J Power. He is a founding member of Fuck Buttons.

In 2022 Power announced he joined Editors as a full-time member.

Career
His track "Sundowner" was used at key points during the Opening Ceremony of the 2012 Olympic games. It was first heard as the Union Flag was brought into the stadium by members of the Armed Forces. Later it was played when the Olympic Flag was paraded, and finally as the Olympic Flame was brought to the stadium in a speedboat. 

Blanck Mass opened for Icelandic band Sigur Rós on their 2013 UK tour. 

In 2014, Power announced that he was close to finishing off a new Blanck Mass album, and supported Jon Hopkins at the Royal Festival Hall in September. 

Power released Dumb Flesh through Sacred Bones Records on 11 May 2015. The vinyl version included an exclusive track "Life Science (Ambient Suite)". 

Power supported the release with tours and dates in the UK, US, Europe and Australia and received critical acclaim for the album. 

Later in the year Power released The Great Confuso EP which featured a brand new three-part track as well as remixes of album tracks by Genesis P-Orridge, Dalhous and Konx-Om-Pax. A 12" version of the EP limited to 500 copies in Pumpkin and Mulberry coloured vinyl was released for Record Store Day 2016. 

On 20 July 2016, Power announced a new track "D7-D5" via Adult Swim as part of their Adult Swim Singles 2016 campaign which was released on vinyl in October 2016.

On 20 April 2022, it was announced that Power had joined Editors as a full member, releasing the new single "Heart Attack" on the same day. 

Power had previously worked with the band on their 2018 album 'Violence'''  and the alternate version of the album titled 'The Blanck Mass Sessions'.History
Blanck Mass (2011–2012)
The self-titled album Blanck Mass was released in 2011 through Mogwai's Rock Action Records label and is Benjamin John Power's first solo effort after spending seven years as one half of Fuck Buttons. 

Resident Advisor said that the album "makes the most sense in a car at night, or any place that you can immerse yourself in its atmospheres in cocoon-like surroundings". 

The album was Power's first experience with production work, and it paved the way for him to make his subsequent album Dumb Flesh.

Dumb Flesh (2015–2016)Dumb Flesh is the second album by Blanck Mass and marks the switch from the Rock Action Records label to Sacred Bones Records. 

The album has been described by Pitchfork as danceable and more accessible than the first self-titled album: "Power's strengths come out at once: dark noise gives way to a pounding rhythm which, in turn, melts into a tapestry of airy synths". Dumb Flesh received ample critical acclaim and it was toured extensively throughout 2015.

The Strange Colour of Your Body's Tears re-score (2015)The Strange Colour of Your Body's Tears is a brand new original score to the 2013 Giallo film of the same name. Originally the film had no original score and used music from existing Giallo films instead. 

The re-score of The Strange Colour Of Your Body's Tears is a stage experimentation and collaboration with different artists from across the globe. 

Every artist had a different scene assigned and were given complete freedom to score that particular scene however they wanted. 

The album was recorded in 2014 and was released by Death Waltz Recordings.

World Eater
Power's third solo album was released on Sacred Bones Records on 3 March 2017 on limited edition black/red marble vinyl, standard vinyl, CD and digital. 

The Pitchfork review (8.1) said that the album was "suitable for casual noise fans who have some curiosity for extreme music and a decent threshold for pain".

Animated Violence Mild
Power's fourth album under the Blanck Mass moniker was released on 16 August 2019 on Sacred Bones Records, with various limited edition vinyl versions available. 

Reviews were generally favourable, with The Guardian calling it "an album that fuses existential fear with sheer beauty".

Musical style
Blanck Mass' musical style has been described as drone music, post-rock, electronic and experimental. 

Power has been influenced by the likes of Carl Sagan and Ennio Morricone to the "infinity of nature". 

Power has also said that in his younger years he was a fan of Mogwai's post-rock instrumentals.

Personal life
In a 2015 interview, Power stated he is vegan, and prior to that he had been vegetarian for 10 years.

Discography
Albums
 Blanck Mass (20 June 2011, Rock Action)
 Dumb Flesh (11 May 2015, Sacred Bones)
 World Eater (3 March 2017, Sacred Bones)
 Animated Violence Mild (16 August 2019, Sacred Bones)
 In Ferneaux (26 February 2021, Sacred Bones)

Singles and EPs
 "White Math" / "Polymorph" (21 August 2012, Software Recording Co.)
 "Hellion Earth" (2012)
 The Great Confuso EP (26 October 2015, Sacred Bones)
 "D7-D5" (4 November 2016, Richter Sound)
 "Odd Scene" / "Shit Luck" (21 April 2018, Sacred Bones)

Compilations
 A Field in England: Original Soundtrack Recording (18 October 2013, Death Waltz/Rook Films)
 Blanck Mass Presents - The Strange Colour of Your Body's Tears Re-Score'' (2015, Death Waltz Originals)

References

External links
Blanck Mass on Bandcamp

Ambient musicians
Musical groups established in 2011
Musicians from Bristol
Sacred Bones Records artists
Rock Action Records artists
2011 establishments in England